Jurij "Jure" Zdovc (born 13 December 1966) is a Slovenian former professional basketball player and coach. As a player, he was a 1.98 m (6'6") tall point guard, who began his professional playing career with the Yugoslav Second Division club Smelt Olimpija.

During his playing career, he was a three-time member of the FIBA European Selection, in the years 1990 and 1991 (twice), and a FIBA EuroStar selection, in 1996. He also represented both the senior Yugoslav national team, and the senior Slovenian national team. He was inducted into the Slovenian Athletes Hall of Fame in 2015. He was inducted into the FIBA Hall of Fame in 2020.

As a basketball coach, Zdovc received the EuroCup Coach of the Year award in 2012, while he was the head coach of the Russian club Spartak Saint Petersburg.

Playing career

Club career
As a junior level player, Zdovc began his playing career with Comet Slovenske Konjice. He also played with the junior teams of Smelt Olimpija. During his senior men's pro club career, he played with the following teams: the senior men's team of Smelt Olimpija, Knorr Bologna, Limoges CSP, Iraklis Thessaloniki, Helios Suns, PSG Racing, Tofaş, Panionios Athens, Geoplin Slovan, and Split CO.

With the French club Limoges CSP, Zdovc won the EuroLeague's 1992–93 season championship, and he was voted to the EuroLeague All-Final Four Team. He also won the French League's 1992–93 season championship, while playing with Limoges. In 1997, as a Paris Racing player, he also won the French League championship.

While playing with Union Olimpija, Zdovc won two Slovenian Premier League championships, and three Slovenian Cups. With the same club, he also won the 2001–02 season's championship of the Adriatic League, and he was voted the 2002 Adriatic League Final Four MVP. With Split Croatia, he won the 2003 Croatian Premier League championship.

Yugoslav national team
Zdovc was a member of the senior Yugoslavia National Squad. With Yugoslavia, he won the silver medal at the 1988 Seoul Summer Olympics. As a member of Yugoslavia's national selection, he also won gold medals at the 1989 EuroBasket, the 1990 FIBA World Championship, and the 1991 EuroBasket.

Slovenian national team
As a member of the senior Slovenian national team, Zdovc played at the following major FIBA international tournaments: the 1992 FIBA European Olympic Qualifying Tournament, the 1993 EuroBasket, the 1995 EuroBasket, the 1997 EuroBasket, and the 1999 EuroBasket.

Coaching career

Clubs
Zdovc first worked as a basketball coach in the 1997–98 season, with Comet Slovenske Konjice, where he worked as an assistant. That was still during his active playing career, but during a time in which he was not playing, due to a long-term injury that he suffered while he was playing with the Turkish Super League club Tofaş. After he retired from playing professional club basketball in 2003, Zdovc started his full-time basketball coaching career as the head coach of the Croatian Premier League club Split Croatia. He stayed the head coach of Split Croatia until 2004, and led the team to a first-place finish in the Croatian Cup. In the 2006–07 season, he was the sports director of Union Olimpija.

Zdovc also won the Bosnia and Herzegovina League championship with Bosna in 2008. In 2009, he won the Slovenian Premier League championship with Union Olimpija. Zdovc also won the Slovenian Cup title three times in a row with Union Olimpija, in the years 2009, 2010, and 2011. He also led Union Olimpija to the top Top-16 stage of the EuroLeague's 2010–11 season.

Zdovc was named the EuroCup Coach of the Year in 2012. On 20 December 2015, he signed a three-year contract with the Greek Basket League club AEK Athens. He was dismissed in the role by AEK Athens, in March 2017, after his team lost a 2016–17 FIBA Champions League game against the French Pro A League club AS Monaco.

On 14 June 2017, Zdovc was named as the head coach of the Croatian club Cedevita Zagreb, as he replaced Veljko Mršić in that role. He was later sacked by the club on 6 June 2018.

On 7 May 2020, Zdovc signed on to be the head coach of the Metropolitans 92 of the French LNB Pro A. Zdovc worked with Žalgiris Kaunas in the 2021-2022 season, though had a very tumultuous season, resigning in April. With Žalgiris, Zdovc won the 2022 King Mindaugas Cup.

National teams
In 2009, Zdovc was named the head coach of the senior men's Slovenian national team. He guided Slovenia to a fourth-place finish at the 2009 EuroBasket. In 2014, Zdovc returned to coach Slovenia, after signing a three-year contract to coach the team. He coached Slovenia at the 2014 FIBA World Cup, and the 2015 EuroBasket.

Head coaching record

EuroLeague

|- 
| align="left" rowspan=3|Union Olimpija
| align="left"|2008–09
| 2 || 0 || 2 ||  || align="center"|Eliminated in regular season
|- 
| align="left"|2009–10
| 10 || 1 || 9 ||  || align="center"|Eliminated in regular season
|- 
| align="left"|2010–11
| 16 || 7 || 9 ||  || align="center"|Eliminated in Top 16 stage
|- 
| align="left"|Žalgiris Kaunas
| align="left"|2021–22
| 28 || 8 || 20 || || align="center"|Eliminated in regular season
|- 
|-class="sortbottom"
| align="center" colspan=2|Career||56||16||40||||

References

External links

Jurij Zdovc at fiba archive 1(as a player)
Jure Zdovc at fiba archive 2 (as a player)
Jurij Zdovc at fibaeurope.com (as a player)
Jure Zdovc at euroleague.net (as a player)
Jure Zdovc at euroleague.net (as a coach)
Jure Zdovc at proballers.com (as a player)
Jure Zdovc at eurobasket.com

1966 births
Living people
1990 FIBA World Championship players
ABA League players
AEK B.C. coaches
Basketball executives
Basketball players at the 1988 Summer Olympics
BC Spartak Saint Petersburg coaches
BC Žalgiris coaches
FIBA Hall of Fame inductees
FIBA EuroBasket-winning players
FIBA World Championship-winning players
Iraklis Thessaloniki B.C. coaches
Iraklis Thessaloniki B.C. players
KD Slovan players
KK Bosna Royal coaches
KK Cedevita coaches
KK Olimpija coaches
KK Olimpija players
KK Split players
Levallois Metropolitans coaches
Limoges CSP players
Medalists at the 1988 Summer Olympics
Olympic basketball players of Yugoslavia
Olympic medalists in basketball
Olympic silver medalists for Yugoslavia
Panionios B.C. players
Paris Racing Basket players
People from the Municipality of Slovenske Konjice
Point guards
Shooting guards
Slovenia national basketball team coaches
Slovenian basketball coaches
Slovenian expatriate basketball people in France
Slovenian expatriate basketball people in Greece
Slovenian expatriate basketball people in Italy
Slovenian expatriate basketball people in Lithuania
Slovenian expatriate basketball people in Turkey
Slovenian men's basketball players
Sportspeople from Maribor
Virtus Bologna players
Yugoslav men's basketball players